The 2018 TT Pro League season is the 20th season of the TT Pro League, the Trinidad and Tobago professional league for association football clubs, since its establishment in 1999. A total of ten teams are contesting the league, with North East Stars the defending champions from the 2017 season.

The 2018 football season kicked off with the Charity Shield between defending TT Pro League champions North East Stars and defending Trinidad and Tobago FA Trophy champions W Connection. League play officially started on 10 August 2018, and ended on the 7 December with the crowning of W Connection by one point over their Couva rivals Central. It was their first title since the 2013–14 season

Changes from the 2017 season
The following changes were made since the 2017 season:

Player transfers

Managerial changes

Teams

Team summaries

Note: Flags indicate national team as has been defined under FIFA eligibility rules. Players may hold more than one non-FIFA nationality.

Stadiums Used

Since the teams do not play in their set home stadium, these are the stadiums that were used to host the matches throughout the season.

League table

Positions by round

Results

Season statistics

Top scorers

References

External links
Official Website

TT Pro League seasons
Trinidad and Tobago
Trinidad and Tobago
2018 in Trinidad and Tobago